Deggial is the ninth full-length studio album by Swedish symphonic metal band Therion in 2000. As with many of Therion's other albums, Deggial features a choir and orchestra.

In 2021, it was elected by Metal Hammer as the 8th best symphonic metal album of all time.

Track listing

Tracks 12-14 from Crowning of Atlantis.

Personnel 
Christofer Johnsson – guitar, keyboards
Kristian Niemann – lead guitar
Johan Niemann – bass guitar
Sami Karppinen – drums
Thomas Karlsson – lyrics (except "O Fortuna")

Guest musicians
Hansi Kürsch – lead vocals on "Flesh of the Gods"
Jan Kazda – acoustic guitar
Waldemar Sorychta – acoustic guitar on "O Fortuna"
Alexander Schimmeroth – piano

Choir
Eileen Küpper – soprano (choir, solo)
Angelica Märtz – soprano (choir)
Dorothea Fischer – alto (choir)
Anne Tributh – alto (choir)
Georg Hansen – tenor (choir, solo)
Miguel Rosales – tenor (choir)
Jörg Braüker – bass (choir, solo)
Javier Zapater – bass (choir)

Orchestra
Heike Haushalter – first violin
Petra Stalz – second violin
Monika Maltek – viola
Gesa Hangen – cello
Konstantin Weinstroer – double bass
Annette Gadatsch – flute
Stefanie Dietz – oboe
John Ellis – French horn
Volker Goetz – flugelhorn, trumpet
Dietrich Geese – tuba, sousaphone, trumpet
Daniel Häcker – timpani

Technical personnel 
 Nico & Theresa – cover art

Charts

References

External links
 
 
 Information about album at the official website

2000 albums
Therion (band) albums
Nuclear Blast albums